Horsforth School is a science specialist secondary school with academy status in Leeds, West Yorkshire, England.

Opened in 1972 and located in Horsforth, it educates around 1,500 boys and girls, aged 11 to 18. It gained Special Science status in 2002. In 2012 75% of students received 5 A*-C GCSEs including English and Maths. Horsforth School also includes a post 16 centre. The school has been awarded the school curriculum award, and has Artsmark and Sportsmark status.

The school won the United Kingdom Aerospace Youth Rocketry Challenge in 2008 and entered two teams into the 2009 competition. It won the competition again in 2010, becoming the only school ever to win twice. The school faced criticism in 2015 for planning an optional sports trip to Barbados for pupils in years 8, 9 and 10, costing £1,650 per pupil.

Notable alumni

Joe Brown, Bradford Bulls Rugby League Player
Tonicha Jeronimo, actor
James Milner, England international footballer
Katie Spencer, Academy Award nominated film production designer

References

External links 
 School home page
 "Horsforth School, Leeds", Schoolsnet.com
 United Kingdom Aerospace Youth Rocketry Challenge website

Academies in Leeds
Educational institutions established in 1972
Secondary schools in Leeds
1972 establishments in England
Horsforth